Tom Stone (born July 12, 1971) is an American humanitarian photographer. His work depicts the discrepancy between the American dream and the American reality, clearly captured through the telling faces of those living on the fringes of society. He is most widely known for his documentary photography of outsider, displaced and homeless populations in California.

Early life
Born in a Pullman compartment on a train outside Mexico City traveling to Puerto Ángel in Oaxaca, Mexico, Tom Stone spent his earliest years with his mother, Raya Ra, and father, Tony Washington (both parents using assumed names). In a recent interview, he discussed that his mother was physically abused; and, fear for her safety (and that of her son), "fled" – first "sleeping in bushes in wealthy L.A. neighborhoods" and eventually joining the famed Source Family.

Given the Aquarian name Sound by Father Yod, Stone and his mother (renamed Astral) lived in Hawaii with family over the next three years. Stone lived with Astral and her boyfriend, Djin Aquarian (lead guitarist of Yahowha 13)until he was 12. Later he moved from Hawaii to L.A. to Seattle and back to L.A, where the three spent months living in a van on the streets of Venice.

His mother has always encouraged Stone to reach his full potentials in life. She home-schooled until she decided to break with Djin to give her son a better and "stationary" life. With his grandfather financing his formal education, Stone enrolled in the 7th grade at the Highland Hall Waldorf School. He continued his creative pursuits, producing art in various mediums including acrylic paintings and watercolor. His interest piqued by the musicals and plays he did while attending high school at Harvard-Westlake School in North Hollywood, CA, Stone branched out to creative writing and film during his college years at Harvard University in Cambridge, MA.

After graduating Harvard with a degree in Computer Science, Stone joined Morgan Stanley as a financial analyst. He worked first in the company's Health Care Group and subsequently in its Technology Group during Frank Quattrone's tenure and thereafter. Notably, he took flash memory maker Sandisk public (IPO). He was also CFO at Autoweb.com and Reply! Inc.

Stone continued onward with his creativity, and began spending time doing documentary video work. While creating videos, Stone grew interested in documenting the gripping stories of street kids, and he began his still photography "as a research tool for that." What began as an aid for another medium has since become Stone's life work of intimate portraits of society's readily forgotten.

Art and career
Stone's work has been shown at galleries and events, such as, San Francisco Museum of Modern Art Artist's Gallery. His photographs are quickly gaining attention for America's homeless and suffering populations, and such attention all but demands that viewers positively impact the lives of homeless persons in their own cities, and teaches them to help out. He is represented by DNJ gallery in Santa Monica, CA.

Tom Stone's documentary photography appears to be desperate, sometimes surprising, reality of homeless Americans. Striving to present people at "some sort of core," Stone's work spares viewers nothing of the subject's situation – be it the frantic sadness in awaken!, the addict's unwavering focus in beavis, or the contrast of youthful beauty and yesterday's soil in sadie. His ever-growing gallery raises the question, what separates them from us; what lets us ignore the depth of poverty in the world?

Stone describes his work as photography that's "about increasing the pool of people who are focused on making lives better in their own cities and towns." All in all, his photography is to get populations to help each other and recognize situations.

Stone has exhibited work in Los Angeles, San Francisco, Miami, and Freiburg, Germany. He has been published extensively, including ongoing contributions to Rolling Stone and Alternative Press.

Quotes
 On Poverty

 On Photography

References

Further reading

 (Cover photograph by Tom Stone)

External links
 Official site
 Flickr site
 Facebook Fan Page
 Interview: Soggybones Magazine (Issue 1: pp. 46–63)
 Interview: Soulpancake
 Interview: Marinscope
 Interview (Video): Comcast TV
 Downtownlife Article
 Life.com photos from Desperate housewives benefit
 Fotoglif photos from Desperate housewives benefit
 Zimbio photos from Desperate housewives benefit
  Source Family official site 

1971 births
American portrait photographers
Social realist artists
African-American artists
People from Mexico City
People from Oaxaca
Artists from Hawaii
Living people
Harvard University alumni
Waldorf school alumni
Photographers from California
American chief financial officers
Harvard-Westlake School alumni